Fenggang may refer to the following locations in China:

Fenggang County (凤冈县), Guizhou
Towns
Fenggang, Yihuang County (凤冈镇), Jiangxi
Written as "凤岗镇":
Fenggang, Dongguan, Guangdong
Fenggang, Huaiji County, Guangdong
Fenggang, Heilongjiang, in Youyi County
Fenggang, Ganzhou, in Nankang, Jiangxi
Subdistricts (凤岗街道)
Fenggang Subdistrict, Sha County, Fujian
Fenggang Subdistrict, Nangong, Hebei